Alan James Lavery (20 May 1904 – 22 November 1985) was an Australian rules footballer who played for the Geelong Football Club in the Victorian Football League (VFL). He played from 1932-1933.

Notes

External links 

1904 births
1985 deaths
Australian rules footballers from Victoria (Australia)
Geelong Football Club players